Zowey, also known as Dzowey, Dakuwa, Donkwa or Adarkwa, is a West African snack combining peanut paste, sugar, salt, water, ginger, and powdered maize flour.

Origin
Zowey is a common snack among the Hausa and Ewe people, as well as others living in Ghana, Togo, Benin and Nigeria. The name Zowey, or Dzowey comes from the Ewe word "dzowor" meaning "spicy powder" in English. In Nigeria, Zowey is known as Donkwa, the Hausa language name for the snack.

Ingredients 

The base ingredients are peanut paste, sugar, and ginger. The ingredients in a typical Zowey recipe are:
 Water
 Peanut Paste
 Peanut Pieces 
 Sugar
 Salt
 Maize Flour
 Ginger
 Powdered Pepper
 Water

Preparation 
Zowey is typically prepared by mixing the base ingredients first, either by hand or with a mixer, and then adding powdered maize flour and peanut paste. After the contents are thoroughly mixed, the paste is shaped into round balls by hand.

References 

Ghanaian cuisine
Snack foods